The 2010 African Volleyball Championship U21 was held in Misrata, Libya, from 2 to 9 October 2010. The finalists will qualify for the 2011 World Junior Championship.

Teams

Group stage
The draw was held on 1 October.

Group A

|}

|}

Group B

|}

|}

Knockout stage

5–8th place bracket

Classification 5–8 places

|}

Seventh place match

|}

Fifth place match

|}

Championship bracket

Semifinals

|}

Bronze medal match

|}

Final

|}

Final standing

Team Roster
Bahri Ben Massoud (L), Mahdi Sammoud, Oussama Mrika, Ibrahim Besbes, Racem Siala, Saddem Ben Daoued, Mohamed Ali Ben Othmen Miladi, Saddem Hmissi, Mohamed Arbi Ben Abdallah, Omar Agrebi, Mohamed Ayech, Hatem Obba
Head Coach: Mounir Gara

References

External links
Results
FIVB Press Release - Final Day

African Volleyball Championship U21
African Volleyball Championship U21
African Volleyball Championship U21
International volleyball competitions hosted by Libya